The 1898 Albion football team was an American football team that represented Albion College in the 1898 college football season.

Schedule

Reserves schedule

References

Albion
Albion Britons football seasons
Albion football